Giaever Glacier is a glacier flowing northwest between Mount Kerckhove de Denterghem and Mount Lahaye in the Belgica Mountains of Antarctica. It was discovered by the Belgian Antarctic Expedition, 1957–58, under Gaston de Gerlache, who named it for Norwegian explorer John Schjelderup Giæver, counselor for the expedition, and leader of the Norwegian–British–Swedish Antarctic Expedition, 1949–52.

See also
 List of glaciers in the Antarctic
 Glaciology

References

Glaciers of Queen Maud Land
Prince Harald Coast